Bay State Select was a Women's Premier Soccer League (WPSL) soccer club based out of Hingham, Massachusetts. The team began play in 2005, went on hiatus for 2008 and folded after the 2009 season.

Notable former players

 Daniela Alves Lima (2005–2006)

Year-by-year

References

External links

Women's Premier Soccer League teams
Women's soccer clubs in the United States
Soccer clubs in Massachusetts
2005 establishments in Massachusetts
Association football clubs disestablished in 2009
Association football clubs established in 2005
Hingham, Massachusetts
Sports in Plymouth County, Massachusetts